The 2017–18 Ekstraklasa season was Lechia's 74th since their creation, and was their 10th continuous season in the top league of Polish football.

The season covered the period from 1 July 2017 to 30 June 2018.

Players

First-team squad

Transfers

Players In

Players Out

Retired

Friendlies

Summer

Winter

Regular season

Fixtures for the 2017–18 Ekstraklasa season

League table

Relegation Group

League table

Polish Cup

Stats

Goalscorers

References

External links

Lechia Gdańsk seasons
Lechia Gdańsk